The Union of Toilers of Iran was a trade union organization in Iran. On May 8, 1944, it merged into the larger Central Council of United Trade Unions.

References

Trade unions in Iran

Trade unions disestablished in 1944